The Furnace is a 2020 Australian adventure drama film written and directed by Roderick MacKay. Set in the Western Australian outback during the goldrushes of the 1890s, the film's characters include "Afghan" cameleers, a white gold thief, and local Aboriginal people. It was nominated for several AACTA Awards.

Cast

Synopsis
The film is set during the Western Australian gold rushes of the 1890s, and its characters represent some of the "Afghan" cameleers (who actually came from India, Persia, and other parts of the Middle East, and belonged to Islamic, Sikh and Hindu faiths) who brought their camel trains to help open up the Australian outback from the mid-19th century. Two young Afghan cameleers, Hanif and Jundah, form a friendship with an Aboriginal hunter, Woorak. Hanif is trying to find an illegal furnace so that he can melt two bars of stolen gold, which he acquired by chance after coming across the sole survivor of a group massacre, Mal. The two men have to compromise in order to survive the journey through the Outback, while evading capture by Gold Squad officers.

Production
The film was directed by Roderick MacKay, his debut as director.

Several of the Aboriginal actors speak their Badimaya language, one of many Aboriginal Australian languages which are endangered. It was filmed in Yamatji country in what is now known as the Mid West region, in the Shire of Mount Magnet (Badimaya) and Kalbarri (Nhanda).

The Furnace was produced by Southern Light Films, Meaning Maker and The Koop, and distributed in Australia and New Zealand by Umbrella Films and internationally by Arclight Films.

Release
The Furnace premiered at the 77th Venice Film Festival in September 2020, the only Australian film selected for the festival.

Reception

David Stratton wrote "If the film has a flaw it's that it doesn't quite reach the satisfying climax it promises; it's beautiful, even powerful, but rather bleak".

According to Jake Wilson of The Age, "MacKay is not lacking in talent, but for a first-time director he may have taken on a little too much. While the scattered quality of the storytelling may be partly deliberate, a bigger problem is the lack of consistent tone".

Writing for The Hollywood Reporter David Rooney commented that the film "Smolders effectively, even if it doesn't quite achieve maximum heat".

Xan Brooks of The Guardian called The Furnace "as tough as old leather and as unadorned as cow hide", while Varietys Jay Weissberg called the film "An enjoyably absorbing experience".  Lance Bakare wrote in The Guardian that he hoped that the film would help to highlight some forgotten history of Australia, giving the film 4 out of 5 stars.

Accolades

References

External links
 

2020s adventure drama films
Films set in the Outback
Australian Western (genre) films
2020s English-language films